The Bhairanpally Massacre was the killing of 96 Hindu villagers and rape of women on 27 August 1948, by the Nizam of Hyderabad's police and the Razakars in the village of Bhairanpally in present-day Telangana state of India.

Background
India became independent from the British Raj on 15 August 1947. Soon after, the people of Hyderabad State began a civil revolt known as the Telangana Rebellion, agitating for a merger with India and against the authoritarian rule of the Nizam of Hyderabad. The Nizam's private army, the Razakars, attempted to quell the uprising of people demanding the merger of Nizam dominion into the Indian Union. They marched the length and breadth of Telangana, plundering and looting villages.

Attack on the village and massacre
From June 1948, the Razakars tried thrice to enter Bhairanpally village but were repelled by the villagers using slings and other traditional weapons. However, in August they gained entry with the help of the Hyderabad State police. The villagers took refuge in the fortess in the village and were able to kill some of the Razakars. However, the defenders were overwhelmed and killed, after which the Razakars went on a rampage raping women, looting their gold ornaments and even stripping the women naked and making them play bathukamma in front of the dead bodies. The villagers were make to stand two to three in a line and shot with a single bullet in order to save bullets.
In the massacre of 27 August and the preceding days, 118 people were killed, as per historians and village elders.

Legacy
There is a memorial on the outskirts of the village with the names of those killed engraved on it.

See also
 Parkala massacre

References 

Hyderabad State
Indian independence movement
Massacres in India
Massacres in 1948
Persecution of Hindus